Gardiner-Tyler House is a historic home located at West New Brighton, Staten Island, New York.  It was built about 1835 and is a two-story, Greek Revival style frame dwelling covered in clapboards.  It features a two-story, tetrastyle portico with four fluted Corinthian order columns.  The house was the home of Julia Gardiner Tyler (1820-1889), widow of U.S. President John Tyler, from 1868 to 1874.

It was added to the National Register of Historic Places in 1984.

See also
List of New York City Designated Landmarks in Staten Island
National Register of Historic Places listings in Richmond County, New York

References

Houses on the National Register of Historic Places in Staten Island
Greek Revival architecture in New York City
Greek Revival houses in New York (state)
Houses completed in 1835
New York City Designated Landmarks in Staten Island
West New Brighton, Staten Island